CR9 may refer to:
 CR9, a postcode district in the CR postcode area
 Cristiano Ronaldo, Portuguese footballer who is currently a free agent, referencing his first season at Real Madrid
 The CRJ-900, a regional airliner based on the successful Bombardier CRJ200
 County Route 9 (Suffolk County, New York), a road in Huntington, New York, United States
 Serangoon North MRT station, Singapore, MRT station code